Mrs. Bucket may refer to the following fictional characters:

The mother of Charlie Bucket from Charlie and the Chocolate Factory
Hyacinth Bucket, in the BBC sitcom Keeping Up Appearances